Grün & Blau (Green and Blue) is a compilation album by Feeling B. It contains re-recorded and remixed Feeling B songs that were uncovered by Christian Lorenz. It was released in 2007.

Track listing
 Graf Zahl (Count von Count)
 Langeweile (Boredom)
 Dufte (Awesome)
 Frosch im Brunnen (Frog In The Well)
 Herzschrittmacher (Pacemaker)
 Keine Zeit (No Time)
 Häßlich (Ugly)
 Gipfel (Summit)
 Schlendrian (Spend)
 Wieder keine Zeit (No Time Again)
 Space Race
 Veris Dulcis
 Grün & Blau  (Green & Blue)

2007 albums
Feeling B albums